Ffrwd Fawr is a waterfall in Powys, Wales.

Location 

The River Twymyn flows from the  Ffrwd Fawr Waterfall at the head of the Pennant Valley at Dylife Gorge near Dylife.

References

External links 
Photos of Ffrwd Fawr and surrounding area on geograph

Waterfalls of Powys